The 2011 AMF Futsal Men's World Cup was the 10th edition of the AMF Futsal World Cup. The tournament was held in Colombia from 15 to 26 March in the cities of Bucaramanga, Bogotá, Villavicencio and Bello. Sixteen national teams from four confederations (South America, North America, Europe and Oceania) participated in the tournament. Colombia won the tournament by defeating Paraguay 8–2 in the final, achieving its second title.

Venues
Matches were played in four venues across four cities: Bello, Bogotá, Bucaramanga and Villavicencio.

Participating teams
In addition to host nation Colombia, 15 nations qualified.

1.Teams that made their debut.

Group stage
The group winners and runners up advanced to the quarter-finals.

Group A

Group B

Group C

Group D

Knockout stage

Quarter-finals

Semi-finals

Third place play-off

Final

Tournament team rankings

|-
| colspan="11"| Eliminated in the quarter-finals
|-

|-
| colspan="11"| Eliminated in the group stage
|-

References

External links
Official Website

AMF Futsal World Cup
2011 in futsal
Fut
International futsal competitions hosted by Colombia